Balaenanemertidae is a family of worms belonging to the order Polystilifera.

Genera:
 Balaenanemertes Bürger, 1909

References

Polystilifera
Nemertea families